Aleksandr Vasiukhno is a Russian male track cyclist, representing Russia at international competitions. He competed at the 2016 UEC European Track Championships in the 1 km time trial event.

References

Year of birth missing (living people)
Living people
Russian male cyclists
Russian track cyclists
Place of birth missing (living people)